Caber can refer to:

 Caber toss, a sport

Places
 Caber, Çivril, a village in Çivril District, Denizli Province, Turkey
 Caber, Sarayköy, a village in Sarayköy District, Denizli Province, Turkey
Çabër, a village in Zubin Potok, Mitrovica district, Kosovo

Other uses
CaBER, Capillary Breakup Extensional Rheometer
Caber (comics), a deity in Marvel Comics
Caber Music, a British record label founded in 1998 by Tom Bancroft

See also
Kaber (disambiguation)